Amangildino (Amangilde) is a rural locality (a village) in Amangildinsky Selsoviet, Uchalinsky District, Bashkortostan, Russia. The population was 110 as of 2010. There are 3 streets.

Geography 
Amangildino is located 59 km southwest of Uchaly (the district's administrative centre) by road. Malokazakkulovo is the nearest rural locality.

References 

Rural localities in Uchalinsky District